Scorzalite is a dark blue phosphate mineral containing iron, magnesium, and aluminium phosphate. Scorzalite forms one endmember of a solid solution series with the lighter, more magnesium-rich lazulite.

Scorzalite crystallizes in the monoclinic system in a dipyramidal form. It has a Mohs hardness of 5.5-6 and a specific gravity of 3.4. It is infusible and insoluble in water, and only slightly soluble in warm hydrochloric acid.

Occurrence
It was first described in 1947 for an occurrence in the granite pegmatite in the Córrego Frio mine, Linópolis, Doce valley, Minas Gerais, Brazil. It was named for the Brazilian geologist Everisto Pena Scorza (1899–1969).

It occurs as a secondary phase in pegmatites and kyanite (aluminium-rich) quartzites. Associated minerals include souzalite, triphylite, wyllieite, trolleite, apatite, lacroixite, berlinite, tourmaline, muscovite, feldspar and quartz.

References

 Scorzalite on Minerals.net
 Amethyst Galleries entry
 

Aluminium minerals
Iron(II) minerals
Magnesium minerals
Phosphate minerals
Monoclinic minerals
Minerals in space group 13